Neg Dupree (London, England) is a British comedian, writer and actor, best known for his act "Neg's Urban Sports" on the British television show Balls of Steel. Dupree has also appeared on shows such as Footballers' Wives, EastEnders, and The Bill.

Neg's Urban Sports 
The entrance music for Dupree is "Sound of da Police" by KRS-One. While performing the "Urban Sports", he often shouts "Whoop Whoop!". People have mistaken this as coming from the same song. However, it is Dupree's own "catchphrase" from many years back, and in some episodes, Dupree entered to the song "I Predict a Riot" by Kaiser Chiefs. At the beginning of each clip, "Monstertruckdriver" by T. Raumschmiere and "A Fistful of Dollars" by Ennio Morricone are played.

Television

Reference for television

See also 
Balls of Steel (TV series)

References

External links 
Official site
Official MySpace

1979 births
Living people
Male actors from London
British male comedians